Eduardo Rodríguez Veltzé (born 2 March 1956) is a Bolivian judge who briefly served as the 64th president of Bolivia from 2005 to 2006 on an interim basis following the resignation of President Carlos Mesa during the 2005 political crisis. Prior to his temporary role as president, he was the Chief Justice of the Supreme Court of Bolivia.

Background

Born in Cochabamba in 1956, Rodríguez is a lawyer and holds a master's degree in public administration. He studied at Colegio San Agustín; later he studied law at the Universidad Mayor de San Simón in Cochabamba and obtained his Master of Public Administration at Harvard University's John F. Kennedy School of Government.

Rodríguez was the Bolivian ambassador to the Netherlands where he also served as ambassador before the International Court of Justice. On 12 November 2019, he resigned from that post upon the assumption of the government of Jeanine Áñez.

Presidency (2005–2006) 

In 2005, after weeks of civil unrest led by cocalero activist Evo Morales, former president Carlos Mesa offered his resignation to Congress. Senate President Hormando Vaca Diez and Chamber of Deputies leader Mario Cossío did not take the post, under pressure from opposition protestors. Rodríguez, as non-partisan head of the judiciary and fourth in the line of succession, became the country's new president on June 10, 2005; he was inaugurated with the constitutional mandate to call elections within one year's time.

Evo Morales won the December 2005 general election and Rodriguez's term ended upon Morales' inauguration.

Post-presidency (2006–present)

Treason charges
Under the Morales administration, Rodriguez has been charged with treason following the decommissioning of missiles during his term in office. Bolivia bought about 30 HN-5 shoulder-launched missiles from China in 1993 or 1998. By 2005 they had become obsolete and Rodriguez made the decision to destroy them; he says he did not know the United States would be the ones to be given the missiles for destruction. Before taking office, Morales charged that the transfer amounted to putting the country "under foreign domination."

He was charged with treason in 2006, which carries a 30-year prison term. He has since been cleared of all charges.

See also
History of Bolivia
List of presidents of Bolivia
Politics of Bolivia

References

External links

 Official web site of the president of Bolivia
 Biography by CIDOB 
  New Bolivia leader promises poll (BBC News, 10 June 2005)
  Bolivia's peacemaker seeks brighter future, BBC News, 27 July 2005

|-

1956 births
Living people
20th-century Bolivian judges
21st-century Bolivian judges
Harvard Kennedy School alumni
Magistrates of the Supreme Tribunal of Justice of Bolivia
Presidents of the Supreme Tribunal of Justice of Bolivia
People from Cochabamba
Presidents of Bolivia